The mixed double sculls competition at the 2016 Summer Paralympics in Rio de Janeiro took place at Rodrigo de Freitas Lagoon.

Results

Heats
The winner of each heat qualified to the finals, remainder to the repechage.

Heat 1

Heat 2

Repechages
First two of each repechage qualified to the medal final, remainder to Final B.

Repechage 1

Repechage 2

Finals

Final A

Final B

References

Mixed double sculls